Lisette may refer to:

People:
Jean Lisette Aroeste (1932-2020), Star Trek fan who sold scripts to the program
Lisette de Brinon (1896–1982), the Jewish wife of the pro-Nazi French collaborator, Fernand de Brinon
Lisette Burrows, New Zealand physical education academic
Lisette Diaz (born 1983), American actress, model and beauty pageant contestant
Lisette Dufour (born 1949), Québécoise voice actress, the French voice of Lisa Simpson on The Simpsons
Lisette Denison Forth (1786–1866), African-American woman from Michigan who was born a slave
Lisette Kampus (born 1984), Estonian LGBT rights movement activist
Lisette Kohlhagen (1890–1969), South Australian artist
Lisette Lanvin (1913–2004), French film actress
Lisette Lapointe (born 1943), Quebec politician, journalist and teacher
Gabriel Lisette (1919–2001), Chadian politician, played a key role in the decolonization of Chad
Lisette Luca of Luca Family Singers, African American singing group in the 19th century
Lisette Marton or Amélie Le Gall, French competitive cyclist
Lisette Melendez (born 1967), American freestyle/Latin pop/dance-pop singer
Lisette Model (1901–1983), Austrian-born American photographer
Lisette M. Mondello, headed the press offices for U.S. Senators
Lisette Morelos (born 1978), Mexican actress, singer and model
Lisette Nieves (born 1970), the founder of "Atrevete Latino Youth, Inc."
Lisette Oropesa (born 1983), American operatic soprano
Lisette Pagler, (born 1981), Swedish musical singer and actress
Lisette de Pillis, American mathematician, chair of the department of mathematics at Harvey Mudd College
Lisette Pollet (born 1968), French politician
Lisette Schandein, (1848–1905), the first vice-president of Pabst Brewing Company
Lisette Schulman (1951–2015), Swedish former television host and politician
Lisette Sevens (born 1949), retired Dutch field hockey defender, 1984 Summer Olympics gold medallist
Lisette Stenberg (1770–1847), Swedish stage actress, singer and pianist
Aurélie Marie-Lisette Talate (1941–2012), Chagossian activist
Lisette Verea (1914–2003), Romanian-born cabaret singer and actress

Other:
Lisette (Let Them Eat Cake) of Let Them Eat Cake (TV series), British sitcom that aired on BBC One in 1999
Severe Tropical Storm Lisette (1997), South-West Indian Ocean cyclone
Tropical Storm Lisette in 1997
Lisette, a horse of French soldier Marcellin Marbot (1782-1854)

See also
Glissette
Lissette
Lizette, a given name
Louisiette